Roark Whitney Wickliffe Bradford (August 21, 1896, Lauderdale County, Tennessee — November 13, 1948, New Orleans, Louisiana) was an American short story writer and novelist.

Life
He attended University of California, Berkeley, and served as a first lieutenant in the Coast Artillery during World War I.

He married Lydia Sehorn, divorcing her in July 1933 after having only son Richard Bradford.  He then married Mary Rose Sciarra Himler, also a writer, in Carlsbad, New Mexico. He was night city editor for the New Orleans Times-Picayune.

Bradford continued to produce well-received work during the 1930s and early 1940s. He served in the U.S. Naval Reserve Bureau of Aeronautics Training during World War II. In 1946, he accepted a position as visiting lecturer in the English department at Tulane University in New Orleans.

On November 13, 1948, he died of amoebiasis, believed to have been contracted while he was stationed in French West Africa in 1943. His cremated remains were spread over the waters of the Mississippi River.

At the time of his death, Bradford’s writings were very popular. Since the 1940s, however, much of his body of work has been reevaluated. Many criticize his work (as a white author) as patronizing and demeaning in its portrayal of black characters.

Marc Connelly adapted Ol' Man Adam and his Chillun for the stage as The Green Pastures, which won a Pulitzer Prize.

His stage adaption of John Henry appeared in New York City in 1940.

His work appeared in Collier's, Harper's, and Virginia Quarterly Review,

Awards
 1927 O. Henry Award

Works
 
 
 How Come Christmas 1930, reprinted Harpers & Brothers, 1948  (
 
 John Henry 1931  Reprint 
 
 Let the Band Play Dixie 1934
 
 The Green Room, Harper & Brothers, 1949

References

External links
 

1896 births
1948 deaths
20th-century American novelists
20th-century American male writers
University of California, Berkeley alumni
American male novelists
People from Lauderdale County, Tennessee
Novelists from Tennessee
American male short story writers
O. Henry Award winners
Tulane University faculty
Deaths from dysentery
United States Army personnel of World War I
20th-century American short story writers
Novelists from Louisiana
United States Army officers
United States Navy personnel killed in World War II
United States Navy reservists
Members of the American Academy of Arts and Letters